Margaret of Cortona (Italian: Margherita da Cortona) is a 1950 Italian historical drama film directed by Mario Bonnard and starring Maria Frau, Isa Pola and Galeazzo Benti. It portrays the life of the thirteenth century saint Margaret of Cortona. The film's sets were designed by the art director Virgilio Marchi.

Cast
 Maria Frau as Margherita 
 Isa Pola as Lucia, la matrigna 
 Galeazzo Benti as Arsenio del Monte 
 Aldo Nicodemi as Marco 
 Mario Pisu as Rinaldo Degli Uberti 
 Giovanni Grasso as Tancredi, padre di Margherita 
 Lorenza Mari as Francesca degli Uberti 
 Virginia Balestrieri as Druba 
 Carlo Tamberlani as Vescovo 
 Mino Doro as Capitano del popolo  
 Raimondo Van Riel as messer Dal Monte  
 Fulvio Battistini as Zufolo  
 Riccardo Billi as Menestrello  
 Domenico Serra 
 Giovanna Galletti as Madre del bambino ammalato  
 Rita Andreana as Popolana al torneo  
 Arnaldo Mochetti 
 Diego Pozzetto 
 Ivo Karavany 
 Wally Morocuti 
 Peppino Spadaro as Contadino infuriato  
 Mario Molfesi 
 Claudio Giammi 
 Irene Gay
 Tino Buazzelli as Rinaldo degli Uberti  
 Nino Capozzi as Paolo  
 Giulio Battiferri as Contadino pronto al linciaggio  
 Giovanni Onorato as Contadino pronto al linciaggio

References

Bibliography 
 Lucetta Scaraffia & Gabriella Zarri. Women and Faith: Catholic Religious Life in Italy from Late Antiquity to the Present. Harvard University Press, 1999.

External links 
 

1950 films
Italian historical drama films
1950s historical drama films
1950s Italian-language films
Films directed by Mario Bonnard
Films set in the 13th century
Films set in Tuscany
Italian black-and-white films
Cultural depictions of Italian women
1950s Italian films